The Giant's Causeway is an area of 40,000 interlocking basalt columns resulting from a volcanic eruption on the coast of Northern Ireland.

Giant's Causeway may also refer to:

 Giant's Causeway (horse), Europe's Horse of the Year in 2000
 Giant's Causeway, New South Wales, stretch of water in between Cook Island and Fingal Head in Australia
 Giant's Causeway and Bushmills Railway, Heritage railway in Northern Ireland
 Giant's Causeway Tramway, predecessor of the above
 A variant of the Baguenaudier puzzle, called Giant's Causeway
 Giant's Causeway (song), the B Side of Scooter's single Maria (I Like It Loud)
 Giant's Causeway (band), German gothic-doom band of the 1990s